Jamie Sánchez may refer to:
 Jaime Sánchez (actor) (born 1938), Puerto Rican stage, film and television actor
 Jaime Sánchez (sport shooter) (born 1927), Bolivian sport shooter
 Jaime Sánchez (born 1973), Spanish football defensive midfielder
 Jaime Sánchez (born 1995), Spanish footballer centre-back